Shattered may refer to:

Books
 Shattered (Casey book), a 2010 non-fiction book: true-crime account of pregnant mother's murder 
 Shattered (Francis novel), a 2000 novel by Dick Francis: glassblower seeks videotape following death of jockey 
 Shattered (Koontz novel), a 1973 novel by Dean Koontz: family on road trip pursued by psychopath 
 Shattered (Walters novel), a 2006 novel by Eric Walters: spoiled teen put to work in a soup kitchen 
 Shattered, a 2014 novel by Kevin Hearne: urban fantasy in the Iron Druid universe
 Shattered: Inside Hillary Clinton's Doomed Campaign, a 2017 non-fiction book by Amie Parnes and Jonathan Allen

Film and TV
 Shattered (1921 film), a German silent film
 Shattered (1972 film), a British film directed by Alastair Reid, most commonly known as Something to Hide
 Shattered (1991 film), an American film directed by Wolfgang Petersen
 Shattered (2007 film), a Canadian film directed by Mike Barker, most commonly known as Butterfly on a Wheel
 Shattered (2011 film), a Nigerian film
 Shattered (2022 film), a 2022 American thriller film directed by Luis Prieto

Television
 Shattered (Canadian TV series), a 2010 police procedural series
 Shattered (British TV series), a 2004 reality television show shown on Channel 4
 "Shattered" (Star Trek: Voyager), an episode of the TV series Star Trek: Voyager

Music
 The Shattered, a glam rock influenced band from California

Albums
 Shattered (album), a 2006 singles compilation album by The Exploding Hearts 
 Shattered (EP), a 2008 EP by Matisyahu

Songs
 "Shattered" (song), a song by The Rolling Stones from Some Girls 1978
 "Shattered", a song by Linda Ronstadt from Cry Like a Rainstorm, Howl Like the Wind 1989
 "Shattered", a song by Stratovarius from  Dreamspace 1994
 "Shattered", a song by Pantera from Cowboys from Hell 1990
 "Shattered", a song by The Cranberries from Bury the Hatchet 1998
 "Shattered", a song by Backstreet Boys from This Is Us 2009
 "Shattered (Turn the Car Around)", a single by O.A.R. from All Sides 2008

Other uses
 "SHAttered", a hash collision attack on SHA-1 algorithm

See also
 Shatter (disambiguation)